Age of Science (2005) is a book about science in the 20th century by author and Egyptian-American scientist, and the winner of the 1999 Nobel Prize in Chemistry Ahmed Zewail. The book is also a biography and autobiography about Ahmed Zewail.

External links 
 Official Website

2005 non-fiction books
Books by Ahmed Zewail
Books about scientists